Brush Run is a  long 2nd order tributary to Jacobs Creek in Westmoreland County, Pennsylvania.

Variant names
According to the Geographic Names Information System, it has also been known historically as:
Brush Creek
Laurel Run

Course
Brush Run rises about 1 mile east of Kecksburg, Pennsylvania, and then flows southwest to join Jacobs Creek about 0.5 miles southeast of Mount Pleasant.

Watershed
Brush Run drains  of area, receives about 43.4 in/year of precipitation, has a wetness index of 403.86, and is about 36% forested.

References

 
Tributaries of the Ohio River
Rivers of Pennsylvania
Rivers of Westmoreland County, Pennsylvania
Allegheny Plateau